Lee Michael Zeldin (born January 30, 1980) is an American attorney, politician, and officer in the United States Army Reserve. A member of the Republican Party, he represented  in the United States House of Representatives from 2015 to 2023. He represented the eastern two-thirds of Suffolk County, including most of Smithtown, all of Brookhaven, Riverhead, Southold, Southampton, East Hampton, Shelter Island, and a small part of Islip. From 2011 to 2014, Zeldin served as a member of the New York State Senate from the 3rd Senate district.

During Donald Trump's presidency, Zeldin was a Trump ally. He prominently defended Trump during his first impeachment hearings in relation to the Trump–Ukraine scandal. In April 2021, Zeldin announced his candidacy for governor of New York in 2022. He defeated three challengers in the Republican primary, becoming the nominee of the Republican Party and the Conservative Party. Zeldin lost the election to incumbent Governor Kathy Hochul while receiving the highest percentage of the vote for a Republican gubernatorial nominee since 2002 and the highest raw vote total for a Republican gubernatorial nominee since 1970. After his defeat, he considered a campaign for chair of the Republican National Committee in 2023, but decided against it.

Early life and education
Zeldin was born in East Meadow, New York, the son of Merrill Schwartz and David Zeldin. He was raised in Suffolk County, New York, and graduated from William Floyd High School in Mastic Beach, New York, in 1998. He also attended Hebrew school.

Zeldin received a bachelor's degree in political science from the SUNY University at Albany in 2001. He received a Juris Doctor from Albany Law School in May 2003. In 2004, he was admitted to the New York State Bar.

Military service and legal practice 
Zeldin received an Army ROTC commission as a second lieutenant, and served in the United States Army from 2003 to 2007, first in the Military Intelligence Corps. In 2007, he transitioned from active duty to the Army Reserve, where he achieved the rank of lieutenant colonel.

In 2007, Zeldin became an attorney for the Port Authority of New York and New Jersey. In 2008, he started a general-practice law firm in Smithtown, New York. He operated it full-time until he was elected to New York's 3rd State Senate district in 2010.

New York State Senate (2011–2014)
In 2010 Zeldin ran in the New York State Senate's 3rd district, challenging Democratic incumbent Brian X. Foley. Zeldin defeated Foley with 57% of the vote. Zeldin was reelected in 2012, defeating Democrat Francis Genco with 56% of the vote.

In January 2011, a bill co-sponsored by Zeldin that provided for a 2% property tax cap became law.

In June 2011, Zeldin voted against the Marriage Equality Act, which the Senate passed 33–29. Governor Andrew Cuomo signed the bill into law. In a statement after the bill passed, Zeldin said: "It is my belief that marriage should be defined as between a man and a woman."

In December 2011, Zeldin supported a $250 million cut to the MTA payroll tax.

In March 2012, Zeldin helped to create the PFC Joseph Dwyer PTSD Peer-to-Peer Veterans Support program; funding for the program was included in the 2012–13 New York State Budget.

Zeldin did not vote on the NY SAFE Act, a gun control bill that passed the New York State Senate on January 14, 2013, and later became law. He missed the vote because he was in Virginia on Army Reserve duty. In a statement released to the press after the vote, he said he would have voted against the measure.

In February 2014, Zeldin introduced a bill that sought to halt implementation of the Common Core curriculum for three years.

In March 2014, Zeldin voted against the New York Dream Act, which would allow undocumented students who meet in-state tuition requirements to obtain financial aid to study at the university level.

U.S. House of Representatives

Elections

2008 

In 2008, Zeldin challenged incumbent Representative Tim Bishop in New York's 1st congressional district. Bishop defeated Zeldin, 58%–42%.

2014 

On October 6, 2013, Zeldin announced he would again seek the Republican nomination to run against Bishop. His state senate district included much of the congressional district's western portion.

Zeldin defeated George Demos in the Republican primary and ran unopposed for the Conservative Party nomination in the June 24 primary. On November 4, he defeated Bishop with 54% of the vote.

2016 

In February 2015, the National Republican Congressional Committee announced that Zeldin was one of 12 members in the Patriot Program, a program designed to help protect vulnerable Republican incumbents in the 2016 election.

In the 2016 Republican primary, Zeldin faced no opposition. In the November 8 general election, he faced Democratic nominee Anna Throne-Holst, a member of the Southampton Town Board. Zeldin won with 58% of the vote.

2018 

Zeldin ran unopposed in the 2018 Republican primary. In the November general election his chief opponent was  Democratic nominee Perry Gershon, who also had the endorsement of the Working Families Party.

Zeldin's 2018 campaign featured fundraisers with Breitbart News founder Steve Bannon and Sebastian Gorka. At the Gorka event, reporters from local news outlets were removed.

Zeldin defeated Gershon, 51.5%–47.4%.

2020 

Zeldin ran unopposed in the Republican primary. In the November 3, general election, he defeated Democratic nominee Nancy Goroff, 54.9%-45.1%.

Tenure
As of August 2020, Zeldin was one of two Jewish Republicans in Congress.

Amid the 2022 Russian invasion of Ukraine, Zeldin was one of 963 Americans the Russian Foreign Ministry banned from entering Russia.

Committee assignments
Committee on Foreign Affairs
Subcommittee on the Middle East and North Africa
Subcommittee on Terrorism, Nonproliferation, and Trade
Committee on Financial Services
Subcommittee on Housing and Insurance
Subcommittee on Oversight and Investigations
Subcommittee on Terrorism and Illicit Finance

Caucus memberships
Bipartisan Heroin and Opioids Task Force
Congressional Addiction, Treatment and Recovery Caucus
Congressional Estuary Caucus
Conservative Climate Caucus
Climate Solutions Caucus 
House Republican Israel Caucus (Co-chair) 	
Long Island Sound Caucus (Co-chair)
Republican Main Street Partnership

2022 gubernatorial campaign

In April 2021, Zeldin announced he would run for governor of New York in 2022. On April 30, 2021, Zeldin announced that Erie and Niagara counties' Republican party chairs had endorsed his campaign, giving him the necessary 50% of state committee support to gain the Republican nomination. In June 2021, Republican state chair Nick Langworthy named Zeldin the party's "presumed nominee" after he earned 85% of a straw poll vote of county leaders. Conservative state chair Gerard Kassar also called Zeldin the "presumptive nominee" of the Conservative Party of New York State. As of August 2021, Zeldin had been endorsed by 49 of New York's 62 county Republican party chairs.

Zeldin's campaign reportedly raised $4 million during the first half of 2021 and $4.3 million in the second half. 90% of his donations are small-dollar donations. Zeldin has visited every county in New York state twice during his campaign. In November 2021, he declined to commit to campaigning with Donald Trump, saying, "There are plenty of New Yorkers who love him, there are plenty of New Yorkers out there who don't."

On March 1, 2022, Zeldin received the New York Republican State Committee's designation for governor of New York; 85% of the committee voted to back him. He has also received the Conservative Party's designation. Zeldin's preferred pick for lieutenant governor, retired NYPD Deputy Inspector Alison Esposito, ran unopposed and also received the state party's designation.

Zeldin faced Rob Astorino, Andrew Giuliani, and Harry Wilson in the 2022 Republican gubernatorial primary and was declared the winner on June 29, 2022. He faced incumbent Governor Kathy Hochul in the November general election.

On July 21, 2022, Zeldin was attacked at a campaign event in Perinton, New York. A man, later identified as David Jakubonis, got on the stage while Zeldin was giving a speech and attacked him with a pointed plastic key chain intended to be used for self-defense. AMVETS national director Joe Chenelly stopped the attacker. The Monroe County Sheriff's Department detained the man before releasing him the next day without bail. Monroe County district attorney Sandra Doorley, who is also a co-chair of Zeldin's campaign, recused herself from the case because she was at the event. After his initial release, Jakubonis was arrested on federal assault charges. After being indicted, he said he had been drinking on the day of the attack and "did not know who" Zeldin was.

Zeldin lost the election to Hochul, while receiving the highest vote percentage for a Republican gubernatorial nominee since 2002.

Political positions

Abortion
In May 2015, Zeldin voted for the Pain-Capable Unborn Child Protection Act, a bill he co-sponsored, which would prohibit abortions in cases where the fetus's probable age is 20 weeks or more, with exceptions in cases of rape, incest, or if the mother's life was in danger. The act would also impose criminal penalties on doctors who violated the ban. It did not pass.

On September 18, 2015, Zeldin voted for the Defund Planned Parenthood Act of 2015, a bill that would defund the nonprofit organization Planned Parenthood for one year unless the organization agreed not to provide abortion services.

In January 2020, Zeldin joined a "friend of the court" brief demanding that the U.S. Supreme Court overturn Roe v. Wade.

In April 2022, Zeldin said it would be "a great idea" to appoint a health commissioner who was opposed to abortion.

Zeldin opposes abortion, and has said that regardless of what the Supreme Court decides on Roe v. Wade, "nothing changes in the state of New York". When the Court overturned Roe v. Wade in June 2022, Zeldin said it was "a victory for life, for family, for the Constitution, and for federalism".

In October 2022, Zeldin said that as governor, he would not change New York's abortion laws.

Bail reform
Zeldin has opposed New York's bail reform, which went into effect on January 1, 2020, eliminating cash bail for most misdemeanor and nonviolent felony charges, repeatedly calling for its repeal.

Education
In July 2015, Zeldin attached an amendment to the Student Success Act to allow states to opt out of Common Core without penalty. The amendment was passed and signed into law.

Environment
In April 2015, Zeldin and Senator Chuck Schumer introduced the Fluke Fairness Act. The bill would have changed the current system for managing fluke fishing quotas by creating a regional approach to updating quotas and standards based on geographic, scientific, and economic data. It did not pass.

On July 15, 2015, Zeldin introduced the Exclusive Economic Zone Clarification Act. The bill proposed to amend the boundary in part of the federal Exclusive Economic Zone (EEZ). It would give fisheries management of Block Island Sound exclusively to New York and Rhode Island. (Some Connecticut fishermen alleged that the bill could put them out of business.) The bill died in committee.

In September 2015, Zeldin and Citizens Campaign for the Environment executive director Adrienne Esposito condemned a proposed federal plan for dumping of dredged materials, saying, "We can't just assume that dumping these waste spoils in the Long Island Sound is environmentally benign."

In April 2018, Zeldin said he did not support the Paris Agreement in its form at that time. He expressed concern about "other countries that are contributing to very adverse impacts on our climate but not having the level of responsibility that they need to have in stepping up and making a positive change in their own countries".

Foreign affairs

In January 2016, the New York Post reported that Zeldin was a no-show in 2015 at 12 of 18 House Committee on Foreign Affairs hearings that dealt specifically with ISIL and with Syria.
	
In February 2016, Zeldin and Representatives Mike Pompeo and Frank LoBiondo sought visas to travel to Iran to check the country's compliance with the Iran nuclear deal framework. In June 2016, Iran called the request a "publicity stunt" and said it would deny the visas.

Zeldin has said that Israel is "America's strongest ally" and that Congress must "protect Israel's right to self-defense". In 2016, he spoke in support of the anti-Boycott, Divestment and Sanctions (BDS) legislation that passed the New York State Senate. In March 2017, he co-sponsored a bipartisan bill in the House, the Israel Anti-Boycott Act, to oppose boycotts of Israel and "further combat the anti-Israel boycott, divestment and sanctions (BDS) movement". He supported the Trump administration's decision to relocate the U.S. Embassy in Israel from Tel Aviv to Jerusalem in May 2018 as part of the United States recognition of Jerusalem as capital of Israel.

Zeldin spoke highly of the Abraham Accords and nominated Jared Kushner and Avi Berkowitz for a Nobel Peace Prize for their work on the agreement.

Health care
In 2015, Zeldin co-sponsored two bills in Congress to combat Lyme disease, the Tick-Borne Disease Research and Accountability and Transparency Act of 2015 and the 21st Century Cures Act.

On May 4, 2017, Zeldin voted to repeal the Affordable Care Act (Obamacare) and pass the American Health Care Act.

According to an April 2020 announcement by Zeldin, he helped Suffolk County obtain more than 1.2 million pieces of personal protective equipment from the White House for Suffolk County to aid workers against the COVID-19 pandemic, after conversations with Jared Kushner.

During the 2020 election campaign, Zeldin participated in campaign rallies without wearing a mask or adhering to social distancing.

Zeldin is vaccinated against COVID-19.

After Governor Kathy Hochul imposed a vaccination mandate on health care workers, Zeldin criticized Stony Brook University Hospital for firing employees who declined to be vaccinated against COVID-19, and for using incendiary language in termination letters to those employees. He also opposes mask mandates and COVID-19 vaccine mandates for schoolchildren.

Infrastructure
Zeldin voted against both the bipartisan Infrastructure Investment and Jobs Act on July 1, 2021, and the Senate amendment to it on November 5, 2021.

Land management 
In April 2016, Zeldin introduced legislation to prevent the federal government's sale of Plum Island to the highest bidder. The next month, his bill unanimously passed the House.

LGBT rights 
As a New York state senator in 2011, Zeldin voted against allowing same-sex marriage in New York during roll-call for the Marriage Equality Act, which legalized same-sex marriage in the state.

In June 2015, after the United States Supreme Court ruled in Obergefell v. Hodges that state-level bans on same-sex marriage are unconstitutional, Zeldin would not comment about his view of same-sex marriage, but indicated he believed the issue should have been decided at the state level. A month later, he co-sponsored the First Amendment Defense Act, a bill "to protect individuals and institutions from punitive action by the government – such as revoking tax exempt status or withholding federal grants or benefits – for believing that marriage is between one man and one woman and for opposing sex outside of marriage". Critics of the measure said it would enable people to violate same-sex couples' and their children's legal rights by discriminating against them.

In May 2019, Zeldin voted against the Equality Act.

In July 2022, Zeldin was one of 47 Republican representatives who voted in favor of the Respect for Marriage Act, which would codify the right to same-sex marriage in federal law. Zeldin did not vote on its final passage on December 8, 2022.

Taxes 
In November 2017, Zeldin said he was not yet satisfied with the proposed Republican tax bill. He cited his concerns with the elimination of the state and local tax deduction. The same month, House Speaker Paul Ryan canceled plans to attend a fundraiser for Zeldin after Zeldin voted against the House version of the bill. In December, Zeldin called the tax bill "a geographic redistribution of wealth" that takes money from some states while providing tax relief to others. He suggested that the removal of the state tax deduction could have been implemented gradually.

Zeldin voted against the Tax Cuts and Jobs Act of 2017, which passed in December 2017. He supported the corporate tax cuts in the bill but did not approve of the limit for property tax deductions, preferring a cap of $20,000 or $25,000 to the $10,000 cap in the bill.

Trump administration 

On May 3, 2016, Zeldin endorsed Donald Trump as the Republican presidential nominee. Zeldin had previously indicated that he would support whoever won the Republican nomination. During the campaign, Zeldin faulted Trump for a comment about Khizr and Ghazala Khan, a Gold Star family whose son Humayun, a captain in the Army, was killed during the Iraq War, but said he would continue to support Trump's candidacy.

During Trump's presidency, Zeldin was a staunch Trump ally.

In 2017, Zeldin supported Trump's firing of FBI Director James Comey, saying it offered the FBI a chance at a "fresh start" to rebuild trust. In May 2018, Zeldin called for the criminal prosecution of former FBI deputy director Andrew McCabe. Also that month Zeldin called for creating a special counsel investigation into the FBI and the Department of Justice regarding their investigations into Russian interference in the 2016 United States elections. Zeldin said the investigations were launched with "insufficient intelligence and biased motivations", with surveillance warrants for Trump campaign staffers obtained in "deeply flawed and questionable" ways. He called for an investigation into the FBI's decision to conclude its investigation into the Hillary Clinton email controversy.

During the 2018–19 United States federal government shutdown, Zeldin voted with the Republican caucus against the appropriations measure to fund the federal government. He instructed the House to withhold his pay until the shutdown ended, saying: "It's crazy to me that members of Congress get paid while other federal employees do not."

Zeldin prominently defended Trump during his first impeachment hearings in relation to the Trump–Ukraine scandal, where Trump requested that Ukrainian President Volodymyr Zelenskyy investigate Democratic presidential candidate Joe Biden and his son Hunter. Zeldin said in October 2019, "It is crystal clear... that any allegation that President Trump was trying to get President Zelensky [sic] to manufacture dirt on the Bidens is just not true."

In the seven impeachment deposition transcripts released as of November 2019, no Republican had spoken more than Zeldin, referenced more than 550 times.

After Trump lost the 2020 presidential election and made false claims of fraud, Zeldin was one of 126 Republican members of the House of Representatives to sign an amicus brief in support of Texas v. Pennsylvania, a lawsuit filed at the United States Supreme Court contesting the results of the election, in which Biden defeated Trump. The Supreme Court declined to hear the case on the basis that Texas lacked standing under Article III of the Constitution to challenge the results of an election held by another state. When asked in January 2021 to respond to the release of an audio recording of a phone call in which Trump pressured Georgia Secretary of State Brad Raffensberger to overturn the 2020 election and "find" enough votes for him to win, Zeldin responded by criticizing the media.

On January 6, 2021, after a violent, armed mob of Trump supporters stormed the U.S. Capitol, inspired by allegations of election fraud, Zeldin voted against certification of Arizona's and Pennsylvania's electoral votes. He disavowed the violence and argued with protesters at his Patchogue office who linked his espousal of election fraud conspiracy theories to the Capitol attack and called on him to resign. On January 7, he publicly acknowledged for the first time that Biden would be the next president.

Veterans affairs
In February 2015, Zeldin introduced his first bill, to eliminate the dollar limit for loans that the United States Department of Veterans Affairs can guarantee for a veteran. In February 2016 he proposed federal legislation to fund a three-year, $25-million nationwide veterans' peer-support program modeled on one he helped establish while in the New York State Senate.

Personal life
Zeldin was raised within a mix of Conservative Judaism and Reform Judaism, the grandson of Reform and Conservative rabbis, while his wife Diana is Mormon. The couple have identical twin daughters. They live in Shirley, New York. Zeldin is a member of B'nai Israel Reform Temple in Oakdale. His grandfather, Rabbi Abraham Jacob "Jack" Zeldin, founded Farmingdale Jewish Center, a Conservative synagogue. His great-uncle Isaiah Zeldin was a prominent rabbi who founded the Stephen S. Wise Temple in Los Angeles and his great-grandfather Morris A. Zeldin cofounded what is now the UJA-Federation of New York.

On September 18, 2021, Zeldin announced that he had been diagnosed with leukemia in November 2020, but had achieved disease remission following treatment.

Electoral history 
2008

2010

2012

2014

2016

2018

2020

2022

See also 
 List of Jewish members of the United States Congress

References

External links

 
		
 

|-

|-

|-

1980 births
21st-century American politicians
Albany Law School alumni
American Conservative Jews
American Jews from New York (state)
American Reform Jews
Jewish American military personnel
Jewish members of the United States House of Representatives
Living people
Military personnel from New York (state)
New York (state) lawyers
Republican Party New York (state) state senators
People from Hempstead (town), New York
People from Shirley, New York
Republican Party members of the United States House of Representatives from New York (state)
United States Army officers
University at Albany, SUNY alumni